Blue Haven Initiative (BHI) is an impact investment organization based in the United States and is one of the largest investment funds in the world dedicated solely to impact investing. Blue Haven's venture capital fund invests in early-stage, innovative businesses that improve standards of living, create economic opportunity and deliver products and services cleanly and efficiently to underserved communities in Sub-Saharan Africa.

Structure

Public markets
Blue Haven invests in both public equities and fixed income investments. The firm seeks to increase the impact of these asset classes through a combination of quantitative scoring and a qualitative assessment of the use of proceeds for underlying issuers.

Direct investments
Blue Haven's venture capital fund enables early-stage, innovative businesses that improve standards of living, create economic opportunity and deliver products and services cleanly and efficiently to underserved communities in sub-Saharan Africa. It sources direct investments that are off the radar for most U.S.-based venture capital investors by finding and engaging entrepreneurs and growing its financial commitment over time. A key area of focus is sub-Saharan Africa, a region that it believes provides opportunities for impact and financial returns.

Notable investments include:
 CrossBoundary 
 Umati
 PEGAfrica 
 Karibu Homes

Key people
Blue Haven was founded by Liesel Pritzker Simmons and her husband Ian Simmons in 2012. The fund manager responsible for the direct venture capital investments in sub-Saharan Africa is Lauren Cochran.

See also
 Impact investing
 ACCION International
 Omidyar Network
 LeapFrog Investments

References

External links

Foundations based in the United States